Lubo Smid (born July 1, 1988, Dvur Kralove nad Labem) is a Czech entrepreneur and the CEO of  – a software design and engineering company, which he co-founded. STRV focuses on mobile and website applications. In 2016, the Czech edition of Forbes magazine put Lubo Smid on the list of 30 most important entrepreneurial personalities under 30 years of age.

Early life and education 
Lubo Smid obtained a master's degree in Information Management at the University of Hradec Králové in 2012. During his exchange program, he obtained a bachelor's degree from Coventry University and spent half a year at Norwich University, a military college in Vermont.

STRV 
Upon Smid's graduation in 2012, he joined other co-founders of  – David Semerad, Martin Stava and Pavel Zeifart. He worked as COO until the end of 2017, and was involved in the expansion of the company to the US market in San Francisco, Los Angeles and New York. In 2018, Lubo Smid became the new CEO of STRV after David Semerad. Since taking over he has worked on building deeper relations with key clients, such as Tinder, Microsoft, ClassDojo and Hallmark.

Personal life 
Lubo Smid currently lives in Prague but spends most of his time traveling between STRV offices in San Francisco, Los Angeles and New York. He is also an organizer of Silicon Valley Insights, an event which draws people to come to Prague and educate the local tech community.

Awards 

 2016 – listed in the Forbes 30 Under 30

Memberships 

 Forbes Technology Council (May 2016 – present)
 Young Entrepreneur Council (June 2015 – present)

Articles and interviews 

 https://aplikacky.mediar.cz/2018/02/07/vedeni-strv-prebira-lubo-smid-david-semerad-povede-vlastni-vyvoj-strv-labs/
 https://tyinternety.cz/startupy/lubo-smid-strv-nas-cil-je-dobyt-ameriku/
 https://svetuspesnych.cz/chci-delat-veci-ktere-maji-dopad-a-u-kterych-se-zaroven-bavim-lubo-smid-a-jeho-cesta-s-strv/
 https://www.lupa.cz/clanky/semerad-smid-strv-uz-nejsme-punkova-firma-v-usa-ted-outsourcujeme-inovace/
 https://www.czechcrunch.cz/2017/07/lubo-smid-z-strv-na-ceskem-trhu-jsme-se-stali-znamymi-je-potreba-to-zopakovat-v-usa/
 http://nazory.e15.cz/rozhovory/virtualni-realitu-ceka-velka-budoucnost-rika-spolumajitel-firmy-strv-lubo-smid-1328553
 https://www.penize.cz/podnikani/302997-lubo-smid-od-her-na-tatove-pocitaci-do-silicon-valley
 https://web.archive.org/web/20180414010328/http://mimohranice.cz/lubo-smid/

References 

Czech businesspeople
Living people
1988 births